Events in the year 1822 in Portugal.

Incumbents
Monarch: John VI 
Minister of the Kingdom: Filipe Ferreira de Araújo e Castro

Events
 New Constitution
 7 September - Independence of Brazil
 Establishment of the Carbonária

Deaths
 19 February - Jerónimo Francisco de Lima, composer
 19 November - Manuel Fernandes Tomás (born 1771)

References

 
Portugal
Years of the 19th century in Portugal
Portugal